Pietro Tagliavia d'Aragonia (died 1558) was an Italian Roman
Catholic bishop and cardinal.

Biography

Pietro Tagliavia d'Aragonia was born in Palermo ca. 1500, the son of Giovanni Vincenzo Tagliavia, count of Castelvecchio and Beatrice d'Aragonia e Cruillas.

Early in his career, he was a cleric in Mazara del Vallo.

On May 28, 1537, he was elected Bishop of Agrigento, receiving the indult to receive episcopal consecration on June 6, 1537.  He was promoted to the metropolitan see of Palermo on October 10, 1544.  As a bishop, he participated in the Council of Trent from 1545 to 1547 and in 1551–52.

Pope Julius III made him a cardinal priest in the consistory of December 22, 1553.  He was not a participant in the papal conclave of April 1555 that elected Pope Marcellus II, but he did participate in the papal conclave of May 1555 that elected Pope Paul IV.  He received the red hat and the titular church of San Callisto on July 17, 1555.

He died in Palermo on August 5, 1558.  He was buried in Palermo Cathedral.

References

External links and additional sources
 (for Chronology of Bishops)
 (for Chronology of Bishops) 

1558 deaths
16th-century Italian cardinals
Clergy from Palermo
Year of birth unknown
16th-century Roman Catholic bishops in Sicily